Mary Street may refer to:
 Mary Street, Dublin
 Mary Street, Brisbane